Barge's Tavern is a historic tavern building located at Fayetteville, Cumberland County, North Carolina.  It was built about 1800, and is a 1 1/2-story, three bay, frame building with a gable roof and central chimney.  A gable roofed porch and rear ell were added in the late-19th century.  It was moved to its present site behind the Belden-Horne House in 1978.

It was listed on the National Register of Historic Places in 1983.

References

Commercial buildings on the National Register of Historic Places in North Carolina
Commercial buildings completed in 1800
Buildings and structures in Fayetteville, North Carolina
National Register of Historic Places in Cumberland County, North Carolina